The FSR Tarpan was a van and light truck produced in Poznań, Poland between 1973 and 1994. It was exported to Greece and Iran. The first prototype was presented  in 1972. In December 1972 25 first vehicles left the assembly plant. The mass production began in 1973 after the necessary modifications.

233 model
Tarpan 233 had a standard cab with 575 kg carrying capacity or an extended cab with 350 kg capacity.

235 model
Tarpan 235 had a reinforced chassis and a carrying capacity of 1000 kg. It had also turn signals from Fiat 126p. The production began in 1980.

F-233/F-235 model
Tarpan F-233/F-235 had the steering wheel and a 1481 cm³ engine from Fiat 125p.

239D model
Tarpan 239D had a diesel engine.

Cars of Poland
Vans
Science and technology in Poland